Glyptopleura setulosa, the holy dandelion, is a species of North American plants in the family Asteraceae.

The species is native to the Western United States, primarily the Mojave Desert and Colorado Plateau regions in California, Nevada, Utah, and Arizona.

References 

Plants described in 1874
Flora of the Western United States
Cichorieae
Flora without expected TNC conservation status